Riverside Battle Songs is a 2006 album by Ollabelle.  It was produced by Larry Campbell, best known for having played in Bob Dylan's band.

Track listing

"See Line Woman"
"High On A Mountain"
"Heaven's Pearls"
"Fall Back"
"Dream The Fall"
"Blue Northern Lights"
"Reach For Love"
"Troubles Of The World"
"Riverside"
"Northern Star"
"Gone Today"
"Everything Is Broken"
"Last Lullaby"

References

External links
Amazon.com: Riverside Battle Songs album page

2006 albums
Albums produced by Larry Campbell (musician)